The Norfolk Royale Hotel is a Grade II listed building and 4 star Victorian hotel on Richmond Hill, Bournemouth, Dorset in England. The hotel is one of Bournemouth's most historic buildings and stands behind St. Andrew's Church, Richmond Hill and opposite the Sacred Heart Church.

History 
The hotel was built as 2 large villas between 1840 and 1850 for Henry Fitzalan-Howard, the 14th Duke of Norfolk. It became a hotel in 1870.

In 1946, hotel guest Doreen Margaret Marshall was murdered by serial killer Neville Heath.

In November 1992, Price Waterhouse offered the hotel for sale at £4 million and two years later it was on the market for £6 million. The hotel was put up for sale again in 2008.

In 2017, the hotels owner took a 10 million pound loan. In April 2022 it was reported that the hotel had been put up for sale for £9 million. The sale was reportedly intended to clear the owners debts.

In February 2023, the hotel was purchased by coach operator Alfa Leisureplex Group.

External links 

 https://www.bournemouth.com/the-norfolk-hotel/

References 

Hotels in Dorset
Italianate architecture in England
Buildings and structures in Bournemouth
1870 establishments in England
1840s architecture
Buildings and structures completed in 1850
Grade II listed buildings in Dorset